Therapeutic Innovation & Regulatory Science is a bimonthly peer-reviewed medical journal that covers research and developments concerning pharmaceuticals and the development and use of medical products. It is published by Springer Nature on behalf of the Drug Information Association. The journal was established in 1967 as the Drug Information Bulletin and renamed to Drug Information Journal in 1971, before obtaining its current title in 2013. The editor-in-chief is Gregory W. Daniel.

Abstracting and indexing 
The journal is abstracted and indexed in:

External links 
 

Springer Science+Business Media academic journals
English-language journals
Pharmacology journals
Bimonthly journals
Publications established in 1967